Kuzma (1306) was a Serbian nobleman that served king Stefan Milutin (r. 1282–1321), with the title of tepčija. The Serbian court hierarchy at that time was as follows: stavilac, čelnik, kaznac, tepčija and vojvoda, the supreme title. He was given the governorship of Vranje (a župa, "county", including the town and neighbouring villages) some time before 1306. He was a contemporary of kaznac Miroslav, who held the surroundings of Vranje.

References

Sources

14th-century Serbian nobility
People of the Kingdom of Serbia (medieval)
Vranje
13th-century births
14th-century deaths
Tepčija